Cagayan is a province in the Philippines, but it may also refer to the following places, all in the Philippines:

Luzon 
 Cagayan Valley, an administrative region
 Cagayan Special Economic Zone / Cagayan Freeport, located in Cagayan province
 Cagayan River, in the Cagayan Valley region
 Cagayancillo, a municipality in Palawan province
 Cagayan Islands, an island group which is a part of the municipality of Cagayancillo that includes:
 Cagayan Island (one of the islands that comprises the Cagayan Islands)

Mindanao 
 Cagayan de Oro, a highly urbanized city that lies along the northern coastline of Mindanao island
 Cagayan River, also called the Cagayan de Oro River, in northern Mindanao
 Cagayan de Tawi-Tawi or Cagayan de Sulu, now called Mapun, Tawi-Tawi, a municipality
 Cagayan de Tawi-Tawi Island, other name of the primary island that comprises the municipality
 Metro Cagayan de Oro, metropolitan area of Cagayan de Oro

Other 
 Survivor: Cagayan, the 28th season of the American reality TV show Survivor, was filmed in Cagayan province